Good Copy Bad Copy (subtitled Good Copy Bad Copy: A documentary about the current state of copyright and culture) is a 2007 documentary film about copyright and culture in the context of Internet, peer-to-peer file sharing and other technological advances, directed by Andreas Johnsen, Ralf Christensen, and Henrik Moltke. It features interviews with many people with various perspectives on copyright, including copyright lawyers, producers, artists and filesharing service providers.

Synopsis
A central point of the documentary is the thesis that "creativity itself is on the line" and that a balance needs to be struck, or that there is a conflict between protecting the right of those who own intellectual property and the rights of future generations to create.

Content
Artists interviewed include Girl Talk and Danger Mouse, popular musicians of the mashup scene who cut and remix sounds from other songs into their own (notably the latter artist's The Grey Album featuring music of The Beatles and Jay Z). The interviews with these artists reveal an emerging understanding of digital works and the obstacle to their authoring copyright presents.

The interviews featured in Good Copy Bad Copy acknowledge a recent shift towards user-generated content, mashup music and video culture. The documentary opens with explaining the current legal situation concerning sampling, licensing and copyright.

Good Copy Bad Copy documents the conflict between current copyright law and recent technological advances that enable the sampling of music, as well as the distribution of copyrighted material via peer-to-peer file sharing search engines such as The Pirate Bay. MPAA (Motion Picture Association of America) CEO Dan Glickman is interviewed in connection with a raid by the Swedish police against The Pirate Bay in May 2006. Glickman concedes that piracy will never be stopped, but states that they will try to make it as difficult and tedious as possible. Gottfrid Svartholm and Fredrik Neij from The Pirate Bay are also interviewed, with Neij stating that The Pirate Bay is illegal according to US law, but not Swedish law.

The interviews document attitudes towards art, culture and copyright in a number of countries, including the United States, Sweden, Russia, Nigeria, and Brazil.

The situation in Nigeria and Brazil is documented in terms of innovative business models that have developed in response to new technological possibilities and changing markets.

In Nigeria the documentary interviews individuals working within the Nigerian film industry, or Nollywood. Charles Igwe, a film producer in Lagos, is interviewed at length about his views on the Nigerian film industry, the nature of Nigerian films, and copyright in the context of digital video technology. Mayo Ayilaran, from the Copyright Society of Nigeria, explains the Nigerian government's approach to copyright enforcement.

In Brazil the Tecno brega industry and its unique approach to copyright and sampling is documented, featuring interviews with amongst others Ronaldo Lemos, Professor of Law FGV Brazil. Lemos explains that CDs or recorded music is treated merely as an advertisement for parties and concerts that generate revenue.

Good Copy Bad Copy also includes interview segments with notable copyright activist and academic Lawrence Lessig.

Credits
Girl Talk, Producer
Dr Lawrence Ferrara, Director of Music Department NYU
Paul V. Licalsi, Attorney Sonnenschein
Jane Peterer, Bridgeport Music
Dr. Siva Vaidhyanathan, NYU
Danger Mouse, Producer
Dan Glickman, CEO MPAA
Gottfrid Svartholm, The Pirate Bay
Fredrik Neij, The Pirate Bay
Rick Falkvinge, Pirate Party
Lawrence Lessig, Creative Commons
Ronaldo Lemos, Professor of Law Fundação Getulio Vargas (FGV) Brazil
Charles Igwe, Film Producer Lagos Nigeria
Mayo Ayilaran, Copyright Society of Nigeria
Olivier Chastan, VP Records
John Kennedy, Chairman International Federation of the Phonographic Industry (IFPI)
Shira Perlmutter, Head of Global Legal Policy International Federation of the Phonographic Industry (IFPI)
Peter Jenner, Sincere Management
John Buckman, Magnatune Records
Beto Metralha, Producer Belém do Pará Brazil
DJ Dinho, Tupinambá Belém do Pará Brazil

Distribution
Originally created for the Danish National Broadcasting Television network, the film was eventually released for free on the internet as a BitTorrent download. The filmmakers hope that releasing Good Copy Bad Copy for free will raise awareness and lead to other local broadcasting networks to show the documentary.

The documentary first appeared on The Pirate Bay and then it was officially released under a Creative Commons Attribution-NonCommercial license on the Blip.tv video sharing site.

On 8 May 2008, Good Copy Bad Copy was shown on Swedish television station SVT2.

The documentary and an unofficial trailer are available on YouTube.

See also
 Alternative compensation system
 Fair use
 Mashup (music)
 Piracy is theft
 Plunderphonics
 Remix culture
 RiP!: A Remix Manifesto
 Steal This Film
 The Internet's Own Boy
 The Pirate Bay Away From Keyboard

References

External links

 
 

Open content films
Documentary films about the film industry
Documentary films about the media
Documentary films about the Internet
Internet documentary films
Creative Commons-licensed documentary films
The Pirate Bay
Free software culture and documents
2007 films
2007 documentary films
Danish documentary films
Works about intellectual property law
Works about copyright law
2000s English-language films